The Dallas Belles were one of six teams in the Major League Volleyball franchise. The league began in 1987 and ended short of completing a full season in 1989. Players consisted of former collegiate All Americans and Olympians. The level of play was highly competitive (above that of even the best Division I college teams) and fast paced and utilized either a 5-1 and 6-2 offense.

The Dallas Belles placed 4th in 1987.  This franchise was disbanded after one year.  Games were played at the Los Field House.

Rules at the time were a bit different. The ball could not touch the net on a serve, and games were to 15 (no rally scoring). In 1988 the franchise changed the rules so that game five would move to rally scoring.

Dallas Belles' Roster:  
Lisa Franco (DS) 
Heather Hafner (OH) 
Ruth Lawanson (S/OH)
Sheryl Joseph-Moore (OH)
Laurel Brassey Kessel (S/OH)
Patty Dowdell (MB)
Penny Lucas
Claudia Lee (DS)
Ellen Crandall Orner (MB)
Paula Rideau

Kori Pulaski

Head Coach, Ruth N. Nelson and former Head Coach at George Williams College (1970-1972); University of Houston (1973-1981); Louisiana State University (1981-1985) and the University of Iowa (1989-1991)

The Dallas Belles were the only team in the league to utilize a 6-2 offense, with Ruth Lawanson and Laurel Brassey-Kessel setting the offense.  Both Lawanson and Kessel would later go on to repeat performances with the U.S. National Team to play in the 1992 and 1996 Olympics respectively.

The Belles were known as the team that began each match with Texas created original cow bells and throwing t-shirts to fans which later began a tradition in collegiate volleyball.

Ellen Orner joined the team toward the end of the season in 1987, transferring from the Chicago Breeze team.  According to the commentators "she didn't quite fit in with the Chicago Breeze." Coach Rick Butler just dropped her, according to ESPN reports.

References 

Volleyball clubs in the United States
Volleyball clubs established in 1987
Women's volleyball teams in the United States
1987 establishments in Texas
Volleyball in Texas
1989 disestablishments in Texas
Sports clubs disestablished in 1989
Women's sports in Texas